Virginia City Historic District is a National Historic Landmark District encompassing the former mining villages of Virginia City and Gold Hill, both in Storey County, as well as Dayton and Silver City, both to the south in adjacent Lyon County, Nevada, United States. Declared a National Historic Landmark in 1961, the district is one of only six in the state of Nevada.

Virginia City was the prototype for future frontier mining boom towns, with its industrialization and urbanization. It owed its success to the 1859 discovery of the Comstock Lode. The town is laid out in a grid pattern 1,500 feet below the top of Mount Davidson. Most of the buildings are two to three story brick buildings, with the first floors used for saloons and shops. Virginia City was the first silver rush town, and the first to intensely apply large-scale industrial mining methods.

After a year in existence, the boomtown had 42 saloons, 42 stores, 6 restaurants, 3 hotels, and 868 dwellings to house a town residency of 2,345. At its height in 1863, the town had 15,000 residents. From its creation in 1859 to 1875, there were five widespread fires. The 1875 fire, dubbed the Great Fire of 1875, caused $12,000,000 in damages.

Virginia City continues to attract over 2 million visitors per year. In 2004, the historic buildings were considered to be in a "threatened" state. An inactive mining pit may subside, causing some of the buildings to slide into the pit. The cemeteries have been, and continue to be, vandalized, while erosion threatens more damage. Continued use of the district for tourism is harming historical buildings that are still in use, while neglect of privately held unused buildings increases the damage to the historic nature of the entire district.

Other NRHP listings within the district
 Piper's Opera House, 1885
 Henry Piper House, 1875

Contributing properties
The National Register of Historic Places inventory nomination form lists 65 contributing properties in the historic district, including:
 First Presbyterian Church - 1867; only extant church constructed before the 1875 fire
 Fourth Ward School - 1876; a school until 1936; operating as a museum
 Knights of Pythias Building - 1876; located on west side of B St., between Union & Sutton St.; constructed with cast iron and stuccoed brick
 Prescott House - 1864; located at 12 Hickey St.
 St. Mary's in the Mountains Catholic Church - 1868 (destroyed by 1875 fire); rebuilt in 1876–77; St. Mary's is designed as a basilica; still open for services
 St. Paul's Episcopal Church - 1862 (destroyed by 1875 fire); rebuilt in 1876; still open for services
 Storey County Courthouse - 1876–77; replaced the first county courthouse that was destroyed by the 1875 fire; the brick building is still in use
 Territorial Enterprise building - 1870s; Mark Twain worked as a reporter in the building

Gallery

See also

List of National Historic Landmarks in Nevada
National Register of Historic Places listings in Lyon County, Nevada
National Register of Historic Places listings in Storey County, Nevada

References

External links
National Park Service: Virginia City Historic District website
Historical Marker Data Base — list of all available markers in Virginia City

Located in Virginia City, Storey County, Nevada:

Located in other villages in the district:

Buildings and structures in Virginia City, Nevada
Historic districts on the National Register of Historic Places in Nevada
Tourist attractions in Storey County, Nevada
National Historic Landmarks in Nevada
Nevada State Register of Historic Places
National Register of Historic Places in Storey County, Nevada
National Register of Historic Places in Lyon County, Nevada
Buildings and structures in Lyon County, Nevada
Historic American Buildings Survey in Nevada
Historic American Engineering Record in Nevada
History of Storey County, Nevada